Ectonucleoside triphosphate diphosphohydrolase 5 is an enzyme that in humans is encoded by the ENTPD5 gene.

ENTPD5 is similar to E-type nucleotidases (NTPases)/ecto-ATPase/apyrases. NTPases, such as CD39, mediate catabolism of extracellular nucleotides. ENTPD5 contains 4 apyrase-conserved regions which is characteristic of NTPases.

References

Further reading